Hating Alison Ashley is a 2005 Australian comedy film based upon the 1984 novel Hating Alison Ashley produced by Elizabeth Howatt-Jackman and directed by Geoff Bennett. It was filmed in Kinglake West, Victoria, Australia and Docklands Studios Melbourne.

Plot
The film stars Saskia Burmeister, as Erica "Yuk" Yurken, an adolescent brunette who fantasises about a better life and stardom; and Delta Goodrem as her school rival Alison Ashley.

At school, Erica is not very popular. She sits alone in class, but when Alison arrives, it all changes. Erica at first is desperate to be Alison's friend but soon changes her mind, and they then become rivals.

However, when a school camp comes up, Erica realises Alison doesn't have the perfect life as she imagined.

Cast
 Delta Goodrem as Alison Ashley
 Saskia Burmeister as Erica Yurken
 Jean Kittson as Ms. Nigella Belmont
 Tracy Mann as Erica's mother
 Richard Carter as Lennie Grubb
 Craig McLachlan as Jeff Kennard
 Rachael Carpani as Valjoy Yurken
 Holly Myers as Ms. Lattimore
 Anthony Cleave as Harley Yurken
 Abigail Gudgeon as Jedda Yurken
 Alexander Cappelli as Barry Hollis

Reception
Hating Alison Ashley grossed $2,085,751 at the box office in Australia.

Burmeister received positive reviews for her performance as well as an AFI nomination for best actress. In contrast, Goodrem's performance received mixed to negative reviews.

Soundtrack
A soundtrack to the film was released on 8 March 2005 by Festival Records.

Track listing
 "Stockholm Syndrome" - Blink-182
 "Mr Es Beautiful Blues" - The Eels
 "Don't Tell Me" - Gabriella Cilmi
 "Maybe" - Daniel Merriweather (feat. Lee Sissing)
 "Green Eyed World" - The Blips (feat. Amiel)
 "Cyclone" - Dub Pistols
 "Trashed" - Jacket
 "Lifting The Veil From The Braille" - The Dissociatives
 "Come Clean" - Hilary Duff
 "Sorry" - Gabriella Cilmi
 "I See You Baby" - Groove Armada
 "Lighthouse" - The Waifs
 "Mini Morris Parts 1 And 2" - Cezary Skubiszewski and Paul Mac
 "Six White Boomers" - The Goanna Gang

See also
Cinema of Australia

References

External links

 
 Urban Cinefile review
 Hating Alison Ashley at Oz Movies
 Hating Alison Ashley at the National Film and Sound Archive

2005 films
Australian buddy comedy films
2000s buddy comedy films
Films based on Australian novels
Films shot in Melbourne
Films scored by Cezary Skubiszewski
2005 comedy films
2000s English-language films